Cedric (1821 – 1829) was a British Thoroughbred racehorse. In a career that lasted from April 1824 to August 1826 he ran eleven times and won eight races. Cedric was unraced as a two-year-old, but in 1824 he proved himself the best British colt of his generation by winning seven of his eight races including The Derby and the Grand Duke Michael Stakes. After winning a notable match on his first run as a four-year-old he lost his form and was well beaten in his remaining races. He was retired to stud at the end of 1826 but proved to be completely infertile.

Background
Cedric was a chestnut horse bred at Maresfield in Sussex by his owner Sir John Shelley, 6th Baronet. Shelley owned the stallion Walton and used him to breed Phantom, the Derby winner of 1811. Shelley then bred Phantom to a daughter of Walton, with the unusually inbred Cedric being the result. Phantom was British Champion sire in 1820 and 1824 and made his most enduring impact as the sire of the important broodmare Cobweb.

Racing career

1824: three-year-old season
Cedric did not race as a two-year-old and began his racing career at the 1824 Newmarket Craven meeting. On 22 April he made his debut in a 100 guinea Sweepstakes over the Ditch Mile course and defeated his only opponent, a colt named Banquo. Later the same afternoon he ran second to the filly Rebecca in the Dinner Stakes over the Rowley Mile. On the opening day of the next Newmarket meeting on 3 May he beat Cydnus to win a 200 guinea Sweepstakes, before reappearing three days later at the same course to win a match race, beating Lord Exeter's colt Progress.

On 3 June Cedric started the 9/2 second favourite for the Derby at Epsom, with Thomas Thornhill's colt Reformer being made 5/2 favourite in a field of seventeen runners. Ridden by James "Jem" Robinson, Cedric won easily from the 16/1 outsider Osmond. Jem Robinson also won The Oaks on Cobweb and was married in the same week reportedly winning a very large bet on the completion of the triple event. Following his Derby win, Cedric was sent to Ascot where he won a three-horse Sweepstakes on the opening day of the meeting at odds of 1/4. A day later he started "long odds on" and won the one mile Winkfield Stakes from his only opponent.

Cedric returned in autumn at Newmarket to face six other runners in the Grand Duke Michael Stakes on 4 October. He started 4/6 favourite and won from the Duke of York's colt Orion, with Don Carlos third. Cedric's owners claimed another prize at the next Newmarket meeting, when the Derby winner was allowed to walk over in a Sweepstakes after the other runners were withdrawn.

1825: four-year-old season
Cedric returned as a four-year-old in a match race at Newmarket on 19 April in which he received two pounds in weight from the five-year-old Bizarre, a horse who won the Ascot Gold Cup in both 1824 and 1825. In what was described as "the most exciting" and "the truest run race ever witnessed" the two horses ran together throughout the contest before Cedric pulled ahead to win by half a length . Officially, Cedric and Bizarre were three and four years old for this race as Thoroughbreds had their official "birthday" on 1 May: the modern practice of advancing a horse's age by a year on 1 January was introduced in 1834. Cedric's defeat of the Gold Cup winner was described as confirming his position as "the best in England" at the time. In June, Cedric was sold by John Shelley to John George Lambton for £2,500 and his training base moved to Yorkshire.

Cedric was off the racecourse for five months before reappearing in the Doncaster Cup over two miles five furlongs on 21 September. After winning his last seven races, Cedric started 5/2 second favourite, but finished unplaced behind Lottery. The Sporting Magazine's correspondent "Tyke" felt that Cedric was unsuited by the extreme distance.

1826: five-year-old season
On Tuesday 11 April, Cedric failed to appear for a match race, with Lambton paying a forfeit to the owners of his horse's opponent, Sligo. On 11 August Cedric ran in a two-mile race at York in which he finished last of the four runners behind Actaeon. Cedric was then retired from racing.

Stud career
Cedric began his breeding "career" at his owner's Lambton Grange stud in County Durham, where his initial fee for covering mares was £10, or £5 for a mare who had already produced a winner. His stud career was a complete failure as he proved to be infertile and failed to sire a single foal. Cedric died in 1829 of "inflammation" after standing three seasons at stud.

Pedigree

Cedric's pedigree shows a case of close inbreeding as both his parents were sired by the stallion Walton.
†The Trumpator mare also appears in pedigrees as "Sister 2 to Repeator"

References

1821 racehorse births
1829 racehorse deaths
Epsom Derby winners
Racehorses bred in the United Kingdom
Racehorses trained in the United Kingdom
Thoroughbred family 9-d
Byerley Turk sire line